R. J. Dwayne Miller  (born April 18, 1956) is a Canadian chemist and a professor at the University of Toronto. His focus is in physical chemistry and biophysics. He is most widely known for his work in ultrafast laser science, time-resolved spectroscopy, and 
the development of new femtosecond electron sources. His research has enabled real-time observation of atomic motions in materials during chemical processes and has shed light on the structure-function correlation that underlies biology.

Early life and education

Miller was born and raised in Winnipeg, Manitoba. In 1978, he received a B.Sc. in chemistry and immunology at the University of Manitoba where Bryan R. Henry was his advisor. He completed his Ph.D. in chemistry at Stanford University in 1983 under the supervision of Michael D. Fayer. His thesis work focused on energy transport in model systems of photosynthesis and is titled Part I, Electronic excited state transport and trapping in disordered systems; Part II, Laser induced ultrasonics.

Academic career

Following graduation, Miller gained a faculty position at the University of Rochester and immediately took a 12-month leave to do postdoctoral research in solid state physics as a NATO science fellow at the Laboratoire de Spectrometrie Physique (renamed to Laboratoire Interdisciplinaire de Physique in 2011) at the Université Joseph Fourier in Grenoble, France under the direction of Hans Peter Trommsdorff and Robert Romenstain.
He returned to University of Rochester in 1984 as an assistant professor of chemistry. He was promoted to associate professor in 1988 and then full professor of chemistry and optics in 1992. In 1995, he moved back to Canada and relocated his research group to the departments of chemistry and physics at the University of Toronto. In 2006, he was appointed as a University Professor  and later as a Distinguished Faculty Research Chair.

In 2004, Miller co-founded and took up the position of Director of the Department of Atomically Resolved Dynamics at the newly created Max Planck Institute for the Structure and Dynamics of Matter (MPSD) in Hamburg, Germany. He also became co-Director of the Hamburg Centre for Ultrafast Imaging and the Molecular Architecture of Life research program at the  Canadian Institute for Advanced Research (CIFAR). He currently split his time between Canada and Germany, where he leads his two research group.

He was inducted as a fellow of the Royal Society of Canada and the Royal Society of Chemistry in 1999 and 2016 respectively. He is also a member of the Chemical Institute of Canada, Canadian Association of Physicists, American Physical Society, and Optical Society of America.

Personal life

Miller is married to his wife Margaret and they have three children: Kathleen, Kelsey, and Cameron.

Science outreach

Beyond his scientific work, Miller is dedicated to the promotion of science education through outreach to school children. He founded and is a board member of Science Rendezvous, an annual science festival that aims to expose general public to science and technology.

Bibliography

Selected papers

Review Articles

Books

See also
 John Polanyi
 Arthur Nozik
 Ultrafast electron diffraction
 Time resolved crystallography
 Two-dimensional infrared spectroscopy
 Two-dimensional electronic spectroscopy
 Laser surgery

References

External links
 Miller group at the University of Toronto
 Miller group (former) at MPI for the Structure and Dynamics of Matter in Hamburg
 Science Rendezvous

1956 births
20th-century Canadian scientists
21st-century Canadian scientists
Canadian physical chemists
Fellows of the Royal Society of Canada
Living people
People from Winnipeg
Scientists from Manitoba
Stanford University alumni
Spectroscopists
Sloan Research Fellows
University of Manitoba alumni
University of Rochester faculty
Academic staff of the University of Toronto
Chemical physicists
Condensed matter physicists
Max Planck Institute directors